Manny Pacquiao vs. Lucas Matthysse, billed as Fight of Champions, was a boxing match for the WBA (Regular) welterweight championship. The event took place on July 15, 2018 at the Axiata Arena in Kuala Lumpur, Malaysia. Pacquiao won the fight by 7th-round TKO and Matthysse announced his retirement shortly thereafter.

Background 
On January 16, 2018 it was first reported that Pacquiao would return to the ring on the undercard of Terence Crawford vs. Jeff Horn for the WBO welterweight championship on April 21. Bob Arum wanted the card to take place at the T-Mobile Arena in Las Vegas and have the card take place on ESPN PPV. Early rumours indicated he would fight 37 year old former WBO light welterweight champion Mike Alvarado (38–4, 26 KO). On February 2, after winning the vacant WBA (Regular) welterweight title against Tewa Kiram, Lucas Matthysse (39–4–0–1, 36 KO) stated he was interested in fighting Pacquiao next. Freddie Roach as well as Golden Boy Promotions' Eric Gomez liked the idea of the fight happening. Arum was also open to fight taking place, but stated it wouldn't happen next as he was likely to match Pacquiao with Alvarado. On March 1, Pacquiao withdrew from the Crawford-Horn card. According to Aquiles Zonio, Pacquiao's media relations officer, Pacquiao felt it was insult to have him in a non-main event role and felt he was the obvious ticket seller for the card, also believing he beat Horn in their fight in 2017. In an interview Pacquiao told ABS-CBN television he would fight in Malaysia, where he has a group willing to put up the necessary funds, in May or June 2018. It was said that Pacquiao's MP Promotions would promote the event with a confirmed date of June 24. Arum played down the talks and said the fight had not been finalized. Pacquiao started training for the potential bout on March 12. Although the fight wasn't officially announced, the date was pushed back to July 8. Pacquiao explained the reason the date had changed was because June 24 would have fallen 10 days after the Islamic month, Ramadan and more than 60% of Malaysia's population are Muslim.

On April 2, 2018 the fight was officially confirmed for July 15 in Kuala Lumpur, Malaysia. Pacquiao would go into the fight without long-time trainer Freddie Roach and instead be trained by his life-long friend Buboy Fernandez, who had served as an assistant trainer in previous fights. It would mark the first time in 34 fights, since 2001 that Roach would not be in Pacquiao's corner. It was noted that Top Rank would deal with the television distribution of the fight in the United States (US) with the fight taking place on ESPN+, at the time, ESPN's new monthly subscription streaming service. Due to the time difference, the fight was scheduled on morning local time so that the broadcast of the event would take place during the primetime hours (on July 14) in the United States. On April 13, it was officially rumored that Pacquiao had parted ways with Roach. However, on April 15, Pacquiao revealed via social media that he had not decided on who would train him for the bout against Matthysse. On May 18, according to sources in Argentina, the fight was in jeopardy and likely to be postponed. However, Pacquiao denied the reports a day later and called the rumours "malicious and untrue." By July 1, there were still doubts around the fight taking place, notably from Bob Arum. However, Pacquiao told Philboxing.com the preparations were in the final stages and the funds would be released to Golden Boy in the coming days. On July 2, Golden Boy and Matthysse confirmed receipt of funds and proposed to fly out to Malaysia the next day.

Fight details 
Pacquiao scored his first knockout in over 8 years by stopping Matthysse in round 7 to win the WBA (Regular) welterweight title. Pacquiao dropped Matthysse a total of 3 times before the fight was stopped. The knockdowns occurred in rounds 3, 5 and 7. Matthysse took a knee in the 5th round and was decked by a left hook in the 7th, following a combination. Referee Kenny Bayless began the count, stopping the fight at 2 minutes and 43 seconds after Matthysse spat out his mouthpiece. At the time of the stoppage, all three judges had the bout 59–53 in favor of Pacquiao. Speaking about the game plan, Pacquiao said, "Matthysse has the power, so hands up all the time and do my best. I'm surprised because Matthysse is a very tough opponent and I knocked him down. I was focused and patient in the fight, and I worked hard in training. We did a good job in training. We were pushing hard." Matthysse had no excuses, stating he lost to "a great fighter and a great champion." At the post-fight press conference, Pacquiao confirmed he would continue boxing. According to CompuBox, Pacquiao landed 95 of 344 punches thrown (28%), this included a 44% connect rate on his power punches. Matthysse landed 57 of his 246 thrown (23%), only landing in double figures in round 6.

Fight card

Broadcasting 

* Delayed telecast

References 

2018 in Argentine sport
2018 in boxing
2018 in Malaysian sport
2018 in Philippine sport
Matthysse
July 2018 sports events in Malaysia
Sports competitions in Kuala Lumpur
2010s in Kuala Lumpur